Joseph Black Dixon (26 September 1836 – 6 March 1882) was an Australian cricketer. He played two first-class matches for Tasmania in 1858. At the time of his death, he was the manager of the Brisbane branch of the Bank of Australasia.

See also
 List of Tasmanian representative cricketers

References

External links
 

1836 births
1882 deaths
Australian cricketers
Tasmania cricketers
Cricketers from Hobart